GCF may refer to:

 Antillean Creole
 Gauche Communiste de France, a French political party
 Georgian Co-Investment Fund
 Global Certification Forum
 Global Climate Forum
 Good Clean Fun (band), an American hardcore punk band
 Google Chrome Frame
 Governors' Climate and Forests Task Force, an international environmental agreement
 Greatest common factor
 Green Climate Fund
 Guam Cycling Federation
 Gun Carriage Factory Jabalpur, India
 Guyana Chess Federation

See also
 Good Clean Fun (disambiguation)